Aleksandr Ivanov (born 10 January 1951 in Sakha Republic, Russia) is a former wrestler who competed for the Soviet Union at the 1976 Summer Olympics, where he won a silver medal in the men's freestyle 52 kg.

In November 2013, he served as one of the torch bearers in Yakutsk for the 2014 Winter Olympics torch relay.

References

External links 
 

1951 births
Living people
Olympic wrestlers of the Soviet Union
Olympic silver medalists for the Soviet Union
Olympic medalists in wrestling
Wrestlers at the 1976 Summer Olympics
Russian male sport wrestlers
Medalists at the 1976 Summer Olympics